Clearnet may refer to:

Clearnet Communications, a mobile telecommunications company that merged with Telus in 2000
Clearnet (Telus Mobility), a MVNO launched by Telus in 2011
ClearNET, the UK NHS clearing system (run by McKesson's UK arm)
Clearnet (networking), non-darknet networks